is a railway station located in the neighbourhood of Namiki in Kitami city in Hokkaidō, Japan, and is located on the JR Sekihoku Main Line operated by JR Hokkaidō.

Station structure
The station is elevated. The station is unstaffed, and consists of a single railway line and a single side platform. The station is mainly used by students commuting to a local senior high school.

Station environs
Because the town is becoming a residential area of Kitami, there are many shops and other businesses. Kitami Institute of Technology, Kitami-Hakuyō Senior High School, Japanese Red Cross Hokkaido College of Nursing and National Highway 39 are all nearby.

History
December 1, 1957: Temporary platform opened.
April 1, 1987: Station status upgraded.
October 1, 1992: Overhead station building constructed.

Adjacent stations

References

Railway stations in Hokkaido Prefecture
Railway stations in Japan opened in 1987
Kitami, Hokkaido